Telephone numbers in Brunei consist of seven digits. Previously, the country used area codes consisting of '0' and a single digit, followed by the subscriber's number; for example, 02 for Bandar Seri Begawan.

Number allocations
National Numbering Plan (NNP) for Brunei Darussalam (as at 6 November 2008):

References

Brunei
Brunei communications-related lists